Belizeans are people associated with the country of Belize through citizenship or descent. Belize is a multiethnic country with residents of African, Amerindian, European and Asian descent or any combination of those groups.

Colonisation, slavery, and immigration have played major roles in affecting the ethnic composition of the population and as a result, Belize is a country with numerous cultures, languages, and ethnic groups.

Maya and early settlers

The Maya are thought to have been in Belize and the Yucatán region since the second millennium BC; however, much of Belize's original Maya population was wiped out by disease and conflicts between tribes and with Europeans. The Belizean Maya consists of three Maya groups now inhabit the country: The Yucatec (who came from Yucatán, Mexico to escape the Caste War of the 1840s) mostly live in Corozal, Orange Walk and Cayo District, the Mopan (indigenous to Belize but were forced out by the British; they returned from Guatemala to evade slavery in the 19th century) Mostly live in Toledo, and Kek'Chi (also fled from slavery in Guatemala in the 19th century). The later groups are chiefly found in the Toledo District.

Kriols

Kriols make up roughly 21% of the Belizean population and about 75% of the Diaspora. They are descendants of the Baymen slave owners, and slaves brought to Belize for the purpose of the logging industry. These slaves were mostly Black (many also of Miskito ancestry) from Nicaragua and born Africans who had spent very brief periods in Jamaica and Bermuda. Bay Islanders and more Jamaicans came in the late 19th century, further adding to these already varied peoples, creating this ethnic group.

For all intents and purposes, Kriol is an ethnic and linguistic denomination. Some natives, even those blonde and blue-eyed, may call themselves Kriols.  The designation is more cultural than racial, and is not limited to some certain physical appearance.

The Kriol language was invented in slavery, and historically only spoken by them.  However, this ethnicity has become synonymous with the Belizean national identity, and as a result it is now spoken by about 75% of Belizeans. Kriols are found all over Belize, but predominantly in urban areas such as Belize City, coastal towns and villages, and in the Belize River Valley.

Belize Kriol, also written as Belize Creole, is derived mainly from English. Its substrate languages are the Native American language Miskito, and the various West African and Bantu languages which were brought into the country by slaves. These include Akan, Efik, Ewe, Fula, Ga, Hausa, Igbo, Kikongo and Wolof.

Garinagu

The Garinagu (singular Garifuna) are a mix of West/Central African, Arawak, and Carib ancestry.  Though they were captives removed from their homelands, they were never documented as slaves.  The two prevailing theories are that in 1635, they were either the survivors of two recorded shipwrecks, or somehow took over the ship they came with.

Throughout history they have been incorrectly labelled as Black Caribs. When the British took over Saint Vincent and the Grenadines after the Treaty of Paris in 1763, they were opposed by French settlers and their Garinagu allies. The Garinagu eventually surrendered to the British in 1796. The British separated the more African-looking Garifunas from the more indigenous-looking ones.  5,000 Garinagu were exiled from the Grenadine island of Baliceaux.  However, only about 2,500 of them survived the voyage to Roatán, an island off the coast of Honduras. The Garifuna language belongs to the Arawakan language family, but has a large number of loanwords from Carib languages and from English.

Because Roatán was too small and infertile to support their population, the Garinagu petitioned the Spanish authorities of Honduras to be allowed to settle on the mainland coast. The Spanish employed them as soldiers, and they spread along the Caribbean coast of Central America. The Garinagu settled in Seine Bight, Punta Gorda and Punta Negra, Belize by way of Honduras as early as 1802. However, in Belize 19 November 1832 is the date officially recognised as "Garifuna Settlement Day" in Dangriga.  According to one genetic study their ancestry is on average is 76% Sub Saharan African, 20% Arawak/Carib and 4% European.

Mestizos and Spanish

Emigration, immigration, and demographic shifts

Kriols and other ethnic groups are emigrating mostly to the United States, but also to the United Kingdom and other developed nations for better opportunities. Based on the latest U.S. Census, the number of Belizeans in the United States is approximately 160,000 (including 70,000 legal residents and naturalised citizens), consisting mainly of Kriols and Garinagu.

According to estimates by the CIA in 2009, Belize's total fertility rate currently stands at approximately 3.6 children per woman. Its birth rate is 27.33 births/1,000 population, and the death rate is 5.8 deaths/1,000 population.

See also

Demographics of Belize
List of Belizean people
Mennonites in Belize

References

Further reading
 Forest Cover and Deforestation in Belize: 1980–2010 CATHALAC / NASA / Belize Ministry of Natural Resources and the Environment / SERVIR. August 2010.
 The Belize Debt-for-Nature Swap: Foundations of a Framework for Program Evaluation Emil A. Cherrington. Unpublished Master of Science thesis, College of Forest Resources, University of Washington, Seattle, Washington. June 2004.

External links

Department of State
Early 20th century picture gallery, Toledo & Stann Creek Districts
JSTOR Article
Non-Governmental Organization
Government of Belize – Official governmental site
Chief of State and Cabinet Members
Belize National Emergency Management Organization – Official governmental site
Belize Wildlife Conservation Network – Belize Wildlife Conservation Network
CATHALAC – Water Center for the Humid Tropics of Latin America and the Caribbean
SERVIR – Regional Visualization & Monitoring System for Mesoamerica
LANIC Belize page
Belize. The World Factbook. Central Intelligence Agency.
Belize at UCB Libraries GovPubs

Belize from the BBC News

Key Development Forecasts for Belize from International Futures
Hydromet.gov.bz – Official website of the Belize National Meteorological Service

Ethnic groups in Belize
Ethnic groups in Central America
Central American people by nationality